Francesca Gabrielle Elizabeth Happé  (born 1967) is Professor of Cognitive Neuroscience and Director of the MRC Social, Genetic and Developmental Psychiatry Centre at the Institute of Psychiatry, Psychology and Neuroscience, King's College London. Her research concerns autism spectrum conditions, specifically the understanding social cognitive processes in these conditions.

Personal life and education
Happé has stated that her grandfather worked as a scientist for Technicolor, and "made some real innovations" and that her parents always encouraged her to "ask questions".

Happé read Experimental Psychology at Corpus Christi College, Oxford in the mid-1980s and was inspired about autism by the lectures she attended as an undergraduate. Through her tutor she was able to join a research project led by Neil O'Connor and Beate Hermelin about autism during a summer vacation. She planned to take a PhD at Oxford, but was directed to meet Uta Frith. This led to a change in the course of her life so that she studied for a PhD related to autism at University College, London University supervised by Frith and supported by a Medical Research Council Studentship at the Cognitive Development Unit.

Career and research
From 1991 to 1995 Happé  worked at the MRC Cognitive Development Unit, before spending a year at the Department of Psychology and Aphasia Research College, Boston College in the USA. Since 1995, she has been employed at the MRC Social, Genetic and Developmental Psychiatry Centre, first as Senior Scientist in Cognitive Psychology (1996-2000), then Reader in Cognitive Neuroscience (2000-2008) and finally Professor of Cognitive Neuroscience since 2008. In October 2012 she became Director of the MRC SGDP Centre at the Institute of Psychiatry, Psychology and Neuroscience.

Her work explores how people with autism understand the world. Two significant parts are the discovery that people with autism and their neurotypical relatives may have increased attention to detail and that women and men experience autism differently. She is also interested in their mental health and the consequences of aging.  She has used a wide range of methods to demonstrate these aspects, including studies of twins, genetics, the effects of strokes and functional imaging methods as well as traditional psychological approaches.

Her work has been funded by the Wellcome Trust, MRC, Economic and Social Research Council and Autism Speaks. She has sympathy with the autism pathway approach, including helping people step off that pathway if possible.

Happé has been President (2013–15) and a Board Member (2012–16) of the International Society for Autism Research, and she has been a member of the National Autistic Society's "Autism in Maturity" Advisory Group since 2011. From 2013 - 2015 she was President of the International Society for Autism Research. She has several editorial roles, including joint Editor for Journal of Child Psychology and Psychiatry (2000-2006), editorial board member of Journal of Autism and Developmental Disorders (2001-2010) and Mind and Language.

Happé was appointed Commander of the Order of the British Empire (CBE) in the 2021 New Year Honours for services to the study of autism.

Publications

Happe is the author or co-author of over 205 research publications, as well as books on autism for general readers, students, parents and professionals that include: 
Autism: An Introduction to Psychological Theory, which has been translated into several languages.
 Autism: A New Introduction to Psychological Theory and Debate (with Sue Fletcher-Watson)(2019) Routledge
 Girls and Autism: Educational, Family and Personal Perspectives (with Barry Carpenter and Jo Egerton) (2019) Routledge

Her scientific publications include:

 Other minds in the brain: A functional imaging study of "theory of mind" in story comprehension
Happé, F., Ehlers, S., Fletcher, P., Frith, U., Johansson, M., Gillberg, C., Dolan, R., Frackowiak, R. & Frith, C. (1996) "Theory of mind" in the brain. Evidence from a PET scan study of Asperger syndrome. NeuroReport, 8, 197-201.
Happé, F. (1999) Autism: Cognitive deficit or cognitive style? Trends in Cognitive Sciences, 3, 216-222.
Happé, F., Ronald, A. & Plomin, R. (2006) Time to give up on a single explanation for autism. Nature Neuroscience, 9, 1218-20.
Hallett, V.,  Ronald, A.,  Rijsdijk, F. & Happé F. (2010) Association of autistic-like and internalizing traits during childhood: a longitudinal twin study.  American Journal of Psychiatry, 167, 809-17.
Charman, T., Jones, C.R., Pickles, A., Simonoff, E., Baird, G. & Happé, F. (2011). Defining the cognitive phenotype of autism.  Brain Research, 1380, 10-21.
Robinson, E.B., Koenen, K.C., McCormick, M.C., Munir, K., Hallett, V., Happé, F., Plomin, R. & Ronald, A. (2012). A multivariate twin study of autistic traits in 12-year-olds: testing the fractionable autism triad hypothesis. Behavior Genetics, 42, 245-255.
Dworzynski, K., Ronald, A., Bolton, P. & Happé, F. (2012) How different are girls and boys above and below the diagnostic threshold for autism spectrum disorders? J. American Academy of Child and Adolescent Psychiatry. 51, 788-97.
Robinson, E.B., Lichtenstein, P., Anckarsäter, H., Happé, F. & Ronald, A. (2013) Examining and interpreting the female protective effect against autistic behavior. Proceedings of the National Academy of Sciences. 110, 5258-62

She is also the creator of a series of children's science books entitled My Mum's a Scientist.

Happé has appeared in TV and radio programmes and written for the media. This includes BBC QED and Horizon, radio interviews for BBC World Service, BBC and American Broadcasting Company as well as print media such as The Daily Telegraph, The Independent, The Guardian, la Repubblica and New Scientist.

Awards and honours
 Scholarship, Corpus Christi College, Oxford (1987)
 Proxima Accessit to the Chris Welch Science Scholarship (1988)
 Young Science Writer prize (1991) from The Daily Telegraph 
 British Psychological Society Spearman Medal (1998) 
 Experimental Psychology Society Prize (1999) 
 Royal Institution Scientists for the New Century Lecturer (1999) 
 Winner, King's College London Supervisory Excellence Award (2011)
 Rosalind Franklin Award (2011) from the Royal Society
 Elected a Fellow of the British Academy (2014)
 Elected Fellow of the Academy of Medical Sciences (FMedSci) (2017)

She was the subject of a Channel 4 documentary in the 4Learning Living Science series entitled A Living Mind, which was accompanied by curriculum materials for 11 to 14 years olds. She was a guest on The Life Scientific on BBC Radio 4 in September 2020.

References

Living people
British neuroscientists
British women neuroscientists
Alumni of Corpus Christi College, Oxford
Alumni of University College London
Academics of King's College London
Place of birth missing (living people)
Commanders of the Order of the British Empire
Fellows of the British Academy
Fellows of the Academy of Medical Sciences (United Kingdom)
1967 births